Paloma Roberta Silva Santos (born in 2002), better known by her stage name MC Loma, is a Brazilian singer, who achieved national success in 2018 with the hit "Envolvimento", The hit reached first place on Spotify's top 50 list and reached more than 200 million views on YouTube. She works with Gêmeas Lacração in the group “MC Loma e As Gêmeas Lacração“.

Known for putting a distinctive comedy tune in their clips, the singer and her dancers traveled to São Paulo, where they performed in many carnival blocks. Several singers such as Anitta, Metturo, Wesley Safadão and Solange Almeida had already sung the song that became the hit of Carnival 2018.

On 9 February 2018, the new official video clip of singer MC Loma, was released by Start Music (Kondzilla). MC Loma e As Gêmeas Lacração signed a contract with the label Start Music.

Discography

Singles

As featured artist

Others apparitions

Guest songs

References 

2002 births
Living people
People from Jaboatão dos Guararapes
Brazilian women composers
Brazilian women singer-songwriters
Brazilian singer-songwriters
Funk carioca musicians
21st-century Brazilian singers
21st-century Brazilian women singers
Afro-Brazilian women singer-songwriters
Afro-Brazilian women singers
Afro-Brazilian singer-songwriters